This is a list of equipment of RAF Bomber Command aircraft used during World War II.This list includes gun turrets, bomb sights and radios used in RAF bombers.

Gun turrets 

 Nash & Thompson gun turrets

Bomb sights 

 Course Setting Bomb Sight
 Mark XIV bomb sight

Radios 

 R1155

References

History of the Royal Air Force during World War II
RAF Bomber Command
RAF Bomber Command